Lowther may refer to:

Places 

River Lowther, Cumbria, England
Lowther, Cumbria, civil parish in Cumbria, England
Lowther, New Zealand, township in Southland, New Zealand
Lowther, New South Wales, locality in Australia
CFS Lowther, military installation on Highway 11 near Opasatika, Ontario, Canada

People 

various holders of the earldom of Lonsdale – see Earl of Lonsdale
various holders of baronetcies created for members of the Lowther family – see Lowther baronets
Anthony Lowther (died 1741), youngest son of John Lowther, 1st Viscount Lonsdale
Anthony Lowther (died 1693), English landowner, of Marske, and Member of Parliament
Bernie Lowther (born 1950), New Zealand rugby league player
Camilla Lowther, British fashion booking agent
Cecil Lowther (1869–1940), British general and Conservative politician, 4th son of William Lowther
Christopher Lowther (disambiguation), several people
Claude Lowther (1872–1929), English Conservative politician
Eric Lowther (born 1954), Canadian politician
George Lowther (pirate) (died 1723), English pirate
George Lowther (writer) (1913–1975), American radio and TV writer, producer and director
Gerard Lowther (Irish justice) (1589–1660), Irish justice
Sir Gerard Lowther, 1st Baronet (1858–1916), British diplomat, ambassador in Constantinople
Henry Lowther (disambiguation), several people
James Lowther (disambiguation), several people
Jamie Lowther-Pinkerton (born 1960), private secretary to the Duke and Duchess of Cambridge
John Lowther (disambiguation), several people
John Lowther du Plat Taylor (1829–1904), British army officer, founder of the Army Postal Corps and the Post Office Rifles
Matilda Lowther (born 1995), British fashion model
Norman Lowther Edson (1904–1970), New Zealand professor of biochemistry
Pat Lowther (1935–1975), Canadian poet
Richard Lowther (died 1703), English landowner, MP for Appleby 1689-1690
Richard Lowther, 2nd Viscount Lonsdale (1692–1713)
Robert Lowther (colonial administrator) (1681–1745), English landowner, Governor of Barbados
Robert Lowther (1741–1777), English Member of Parliament
Shaun Lowther (born 1962), English-Canadian footballer
Toupie Lowther, English tennis player around 1900
William Lowther (disambiguation), several people
Zac Lowther (born 1996), American baseball player

See also 

Lowther Hall Anglican Grammar School
Lowther Lodge
Lowther Stakes
Pat Lowther Award